James Parker (1768November 9, 1837) was an American politician.

Parker was born and educated in Boston in the Province of Massachusetts Bay.  He studied medicine, became a doctor, and started a practice in Gardiner in Massachusetts' District of Maine.

In addition to practicing medicine, Parker was an inventor, and received a patent for an improved brick and tile making process.

Active in politics as a Democratic-Republican, he served in the Massachusetts State Senate from 1811 to 1812.  Parker represented Massachusetts's  district in the United States House of Representatives from 1813 to 1815, and the  district from 1819 to 1821.

In 1824 Parker was chosen as a presidential elector pledged to support John Quincy Adams.

Parker died in Gardiner on November 9, 1837, and was buried at Gardiner's Oak Grove Cemetery.

References

Sources
 

1768 births
1837 deaths
Massachusetts state senators
Massachusetts Democratic-Republicans
People from Gardiner, Maine
Democratic-Republican Party members of the United States House of Representatives from the District of Maine
Members of the United States House of Representatives from Massachusetts